Nathan Charles Fisher (born May 28, 1996) is an American professional baseball pitcher in the Chicago White Sox organization. He previously played in Major League Baseball for the New York Mets. He made his major league debut in 2022.

Amateur career
Fisher graduated from Yutan High School in Yutan, Nebraska, where he played basketball, football and baseball for the Chieftains. During his senior year in high school, Fisher led the football team in tackles. During his senior basketball season, the Chieftains were vying for their first state tournament berth since 1994, and eventually lost to Freeman High School. 

Fisher attended the University of Nebraska–Lincoln and walked on to the college baseball team, playing for the Nebraska Cornhuskers as a pitcher. Fisher had Tommy John surgery in 2016. In 2019, his senior year, Fisher had a 3.27 earned run average and led all Cornhuskers pitchers in wins. He was not selected in the 2019 Major League Baseball draft.

Professional career

Seattle Mariners
After Fisher graduated from Nebraska in 2019, the Seattle Mariners signed him to a minor league contract. He made his professional debut for the Everett AquaSox. That year, between his time with the AquaSox and the West Virginia Power, Fisher put up a 4.10 earned run average in  professional innings. The Mariners released Fisher in March 2020, during the COVID-19 pandemic shutdown. During this time, he completed his Master of Business Administration at Nebraska and worked as a commercial lending analyst for the First National Bank of Omaha. 

Fisher was unsigned into 2021 and began coaching in Little League Baseball. In June 2021, the Mariners reached out to Fisher and signed him to a new minor league contract, at which point he quit his job at the bank. Fisher had a 2.89 earned run average in  innings pitched during the 2021 season, between the ACL Mariners, Everett AquaSox, Arkansas Travelers and Tacoma Rainiers. While pitching for the Travelers on August 2, he threw two innings of a combined no-hitter along with Matt Brash and Dayeison Arias. Fisher became a free agent after the season.

New York Mets
After the 2021 season, Fisher signed a minor-league contract with the New York Mets. He began the 2022 season with the Binghamton Rumble Ponies, where he posted a 3.77 earned run average in  innings pitched, earning a promotion to the Syracuse Mets, for whom he posted a 3.12 earned run average in  innings pitched.

On August 21, the Mets selected Fisher's contract and promoted him to the major league roster. Entering in relief of José Butto, Fisher pitched three scoreless innings in his major league debut, a 10–9 Mets win against the Philadelphia Phillies on August 21, 2022. On August 22, Fisher was designated for assignment. He went unclaimed on waivers and the Mets sent him outright to Syracuse.

Chicago White Sox
On November 15, 2022, Fisher signed a minor league deal with the Chicago White Sox, receiving a non-roster invitation to spring training with the White Sox in 2023.

References

External links

Living people
1996 births
Businesspeople from Omaha, Nebraska
Sportspeople from Omaha, Nebraska
Baseball players from Nebraska
Major League Baseball pitchers
New York Mets players
Nebraska Cornhuskers baseball players
Everett AquaSox players
West Virginia Power players
Arizona Complex League Mariners players
Tacoma Rainiers players
Arkansas Travelers players
Binghamton Rumble Ponies players
Syracuse Mets players
American bankers